The 2010 congressional elections in Arizona were held on November 2, 2010, to determine who would represent the state of Arizona in the United States House of Representatives. Arizona had eight seats in the House, apportioned according to the 2000 United States Census. Representatives were elected for two-year terms; those elected were to serve in the 112th Congress from January 3, 2011 until January 3, 2013.

The state's 2009-2010 delegation consisted of five Democrats and three Republicans. With the exception of Democrat Ann Kirkpatrick, who had won the open seat in District 1 during the previous election, all members of the delegation were incumbents who had served for at least a full term in Congress. Also, with the exception of retiring Republican John Shadegg of District 3, all incumbent members of the state's delegation ran for re-election.

As of August 17, 2010, Districts 1, 5 and 8, all held by Democrats, were considered to be competitive by both CQ Politics and The Cook Political Report. The primary elections for Congressional races were held on August 24, 2010.

Overview
The table below shows the total number and percentage of votes, as well as the number of seats gained and lost by each political party in the election for the United States House of Representatives in Arizona. In addition, the voter turnout and the number of votes not valid will be listed below.

By district
Results of the 2010 United States House of Representatives elections in Arizona by district:

District 1

Democratic incumbent Ann Kirkpatrick ran for reelection, challenged by Republican nominee Paul Gosar and Libertarian nominee Nicole Patti (PVS).

Kirkpatrick and Patti ran unopposed in their respective primaries. The Republican primary featured 8 candidates seeking to take on Kirkpatrick in the general election. Mining industry lobbyist Sydney Hay, who had been the Republican nominee to run against Kirkpatrick in 2008, finished second in the primary behind dentist Paul Gosar. Gosar, a political neophyte, was buoyed by endorsements from highly visible Republican politicians, including Sarah Palin. Other unsuccessful Republican candidates included attorney Bradley Beauchamp and former state legislator Rusty Bowers. District 1 was represented by Kirkpatrick since 2009. Prior to her election in 2008, the district had been held by Republicans since 1995. Kirkpatrick lost on November 2, 2010 to Paul Gosar and the seat reverted to the Republicans.

   

Race ranking and details from CQ Politics
Campaign contributions from OpenSecrets
Race profile at The New York Times

Polling

District 2

Republican incumbent Trent Franks was challenged by Democratic nominee John Thrasher (campaign site, PVS), and Libertarian nominee Powell Gammill (campaign site, PVS).

District 2 has been represented by Republican Trent Franks since 2003. He was challenged by US Army veteran and contractor Charles Black, a political upstart, in the Republican primary.  Franks won an easy victory with over 80% of the vote in his favor.

Retired teacher John Thrasher ran unopposed for the Democratic nomination. Thrasher has twice attempted to unseat Franks, losing to the incumbent by 19% in 2006 and by 22% in 2008. Retired biologist Powell Gammill ran unopposed for the Libertarian nomination. Gammill had run unsuccessfully for the seat in 2008, taking in just over 2% of the vote.

Trent Franks won re-election on November 2, 2010.

 

Race ranking and details from CQ Politics
Campaign contributions from OpenSecrets
Race profile at The New York Times

District 3

This was an open seat, as Republican incumbent John Shadegg retired. Candidates were Republican nominee Ben Quayle, Democratic nominee Jon Hulburd, Libertarian nominee Michael Shoen (campaign site, PVS), and Green Party nominee Leonard Clark (campaign site, PVS).

On January 14, 2010 8-term incumbent Shadegg announced his retirement at the end of his current term, making the third district an open seat.

In the wake of Shadegg's retirement, several Republicans declared their candidacy, including state legislators Pamela Gorman, Jim Waring and Sam Crump, Paradise Valley mayor Vernon Parker and former mayor Ed Winkler, and attorneys Paulina Morris and Ben Quayle. Quayle, the son of former Vice President Dan Quayle, emerged victorious with 22.8% of the vote, while businessman and political neophyte Steve Moak came in second with 18%.

Attorney and small businessman Jon Hulburd filed his candidacy for the Democratic nomination on October 16, 2009. The Hulburd campaign got off to a strong start and raised over $300,000 in the fourth quarter of 2009. This attracted national attention with the DCCC naming the race as one of its top 17 races to watch nationwide. Hulburd was not opposed in the primary.

Attorney Michael Shoen ran unopposed for the Libertarian nomination.  Shoen had run for the seat in 2008, earning just under 4% of the vote. Iraq War veteran Leonard Clark won the Green Party nomination.

Ben Quayle won the general election on November 2, 2010.

 

Race ranking and details from CQ Politics
Campaign contributions from OpenSecrets
Race profile at The New York Times

Polling

District 4

Democratic incumbent Ed Pastor is running for reelection, challenged by Republican nominee businesswoman Janet Contreras (campaign site, PVS), Libertarian Party nominee accountant Rebecca DeWitt (campaign site, PVS), and Green Party nominee retired economist Joe Cobb (campaign site, PVS).

District 4 has been represented by Pastor since 1991. Since taking office, he has been re-elected nine times with no less than 62% of the vote. He ran unopposed in his primary. Contreras defeated immigration attorney Joe Peñalosa for the Republican nomination by a margin of 59-40%. DeWitt and Cobb ran unopposed in their respective primaries. Both had run unsuccessfully for the seat in 2008, with DeWitt taking 3.5% of the vote, while Cobb had earned 3%.

Ed Pastor won re-election on November 2, 2010.

 
Race ranking and details from CQ Politics
Campaign contributions from OpenSecrets
Race profile at The New York Times

District 5

Democratic incumbent Harry Mitchell ran for reelection, challenged by Republican nominee David Schweikert and Libertarian nominee Nick Coons (campaign site, PVS).

Mitchell and Coons ran unopposed in their respective primaries. In the Republican primary, former Maricopa County treasurer David Schweikert defeated businessman and political newcomer Jim Ward, and former Scottsdale city council member Susan Bitter Smith, who he had defeated in the 2008 primary election, as well as 3 other candidates. Schweikert's victory sets up a rematch against Mitchell, who defeated him 53-44% in the 2008 general election. Ryan Blackman was the Green Party nominee, but he withdrew. District 5 has been represented by Mitchell since 2007. Prior to Mitchell's victory over incumbent conservative Republican J. D. Hayworth, the district had been held by Republicans since 1985. David Schweikert defeated Democratic incumbent Harry Mitchell on November 2, 2010, returning the seat to the Republicans.

 
Race ranking and details from CQ Politics
Campaign contributions from OpenSecrets
Race profile at The New York Times

Polling

District 6

Republican incumbent Jeff Flake was challenged by Democratic nominee librarian Rebecca Schneider (campaign site, PVS), Libertarian nominee Darell Tapp (PVS), and Green Party nominee Richard Grayson (campaign site).
 
In the Republican primary, Flake defeated Jeff Smith, an investor, by 65-35%. In the Democratic primary, librarian Rebecca Schneider ran unopposed. Schneider ran against Flake in the 2008 election cycle, losing 62-35%. District 6 has been represented by Flake since 2001. Flake won re-election on November 2, 2010.

 
Race ranking and details from CQ Politics
Campaign contributions from OpenSecrets
Race profile at The New York Times

District 7

Democratic incumbent Raúl Grijalva was challenged by Republican nominee physicist Ruth McClung (campaign site, PVS), Libertarian banker George Keane (campaign site, PVS), and Independent high school teacher Harley Meyer (campaign site, PVS).

In the Democratic primary, Grijalva ran unopposed. In the Republican primary, McClung won with just over 50% of the vote in a field of 5 candidates. In the Libertarian primary, Keane won against Andrew Ibarra 54% to 39%.
District 7 has been represented by Grijalva since it was created in 2003. Grijalva won re-election on November 2, 2010.

 
Race ranking and details from CQ Politics
Campaign contributions from OpenSecrets
Race profile at The New York Times

Polling

District 8

Democratic incumbent Gabby Giffords won her race for reelection, after a challenge from Republican nominee Marine veteran and businessman Jesse Kelly and Libertarian nominee engineer Steven Stoltz.

In the Republican primary, Kelly defeated former State Senator Jonathan Paton 49–41%, with 2 other candidates picking up the remainder of the vote. Giffords and Stoltz ran unopposed in their respective primaries. District 8 had been represented by Giffords since 2007. Prior to her win, the seat had been held by Republicans since the creation of the district in 2003.

Results 

Race ranking and details from CQ Politics
Campaign contributions from OpenSecrets
Race profile at The New York Times

Polling

References

External links
Elections at the Arizona Secretary of State
Official candidate list
U.S. Congress candidates for Arizona at Project Vote Smart
Arizona U.S. House from OurCampaigns.com
Campaign contributions for U.S. Congressional races in Arizona from OpenSecrets
2010 Arizona General Election graph of multiple polls from Pollster.com

House - Arizona from the Cook Political Report

House of Representatives
Arizona
2010